Knife in the Head is a 1978 West German drama film directed by Reinhard Hauff and starring Bruno Ganz. The film follows the recovery of a man shot in the head by the police during the raid of a left-wing social centre. It won awards in Paris and Berlin.

Plot
Knife in the Head begins with a police raid on a left-wing social centre in which Berthold Hoffmann is seriously injured. His wife Ann Hoffmann and her friend Volker visit him in hospital and discover that he is brain damaged. The doctors say he needs time to recover, but the police are eager to interview him. The film then becomes a chart of his slow recovery of what happened during the raid. For his supporters it is clear that Hoffmann was shot by a police officer and that the state is repressive, whilst the police led by Anleitner seek to prove a conspiracy led by Hoffmann.

Cast
 Bruno Ganz as Berthold Hoffmann
 Angela Winkler as Ann Hoffmann
 Hans Christian Blech as Anleitner
 Heinz Hoenig as Volker
 Hans Brenner as Scholz
 Udo Samel as Schurig
 Eike Gallwitz as Dr. Groeske
 Carla Egerer as Schwester Angelika
 Gabriele Dossi as Schwester Emilie
 Hans Fuchs as Chefarzt
 Gert Burkard as Institutsdirektor
 Erich Kleiber as Pförtner

Critical response
The film was released in 1978. Roger Ebert gave it three stars, saying it "isn't a straightforward leftist political tract; it's much more subtle than that". A neurologist opined that "Bruno Ganz’s extraordinary portrayal of Berthold Hoffman’s neurological condition is arguably the most realistic enactment of a brain injury ever depicted in the cinema". Writing in The New York Times, Vincent Canby called the ending "both a shock and thoroughly satisfying". The film was nominated for Best Foreign Language Film of the year by the U.S. National Board of Review. Reinhard Hauff won award at festivals in Berlin and Paris for the film.

References

External links

1978 films
1978 drama films
1970s political thriller films
Films about amnesia
Films directed by Reinhard Hauff
German political drama films
1970s German-language films
German political thriller films
West German films
1970s German films